The women's omnium competition at the 2022 UEC European Track Championships was held on 15 August 2022.

Results

Scratch race

Tempo race

Elimination race

Points race

References

Women's omnium
European Track Championships – Women's omnium